Deuce or The Deuce is a nickname for:

Deuce
 Mike Archie (born 1972), American former National Football League running back
 Paul Begley, Gaelic footballer from Ireland
 Clint Dempsey (born 1983), American soccer player
 Danielle Downey (1980–2014), American golfer
 Deuce Lutui (born 1983), Tongan former National Football League player
 Deuce McAllister (born 1978), American retired National Football League player

The Deuce
 David Palmer (American football) (born 1972), American former National Football League player
 Henry Ford II (1917–1987), or "Hank the Deuce", an American automotive businessman

See also 
 
 
 Deuce (disambiguation)
 Ace (name)
 Trey (disambiguation)

Lists of people by nickname